Marcel Mácha (born 26 May 1969) is a retired Czech football defender. He made over 200 appearances in the Czech First League, featuring mainly for FC Dukla Příbram. During his final season, Mácha was recognised as the oldest player in the Czech First League, although he only managed to play one minute of the season.

References

External links

1969 births
Living people
Czech footballers
Czech First League players
FC Slovan Liberec players
1. FK Příbram players
Association football defenders